Flora was launched in July 1813 at Narsipore. Although she appears in a book listing all vessels that sailed for the British East India Company, or under a licence from it, she does not appear in Lloyd's Registers listing of vessels sailing under such licenses. Flora was sold in 1823 at Penang.

Citations and references
Citations

References
 
 

1813 ships
British ships built in India
Age of Sail merchant ships of  England